Winter (Latvian: Ziema) is an Impressionist painting by the Latvian painter Vilhelms Purvītis from 1910 .

Description
The painting is oil on canvas with dimensions 72 x 101.3 centimeters. It is held in the collection of the Latvian National Museum of Art in Riga.

Analysis
The subject is a snowy landscape with a half icy river before clusters of trees in the evening sun.

Purvītis is considered the greatest Latvian painter of the 20th century.

References 

1910 paintings
Latvian paintings